The Resistance is an ongoing American comic book franchise created by J. Michael Straczynski, Mike Deodato and Frank Martin, and is being published by AWA Studios through its Upshot Studios imprint since 2020.

Premise 
The Resistance is set in a shared fictional universe, in which humanity faced the Great Death, a pandemic that killed millions of people, but also causes the appearance of Reborns, survivors with superhuman powers, as well as the founding of a faction known as the Resistance.

List of works

The Resistance (2020) 
The Resistance is the initial series of the franchise, written by J. Michael Straczynski, drawn by Mike Deodato and colored by Frank Martin. The series began on March 18, 2020, and ended on September 30, 2020. Straczynski said he wanted to give readers, especially millennials, something that would impart a measure of hope without "undue cotton candy" while confronting "dead-on" the real challenges people face, comparing the recent paradigm in comic books with the previous paradigms established by DC Comics during the "authoritarian" 1940-1950s and Marvel Comics during the "anti-authoritarian" 1960s. Deodato expressed that The Resistance is “exceptional, even more exciting" than the Netflix series, Sense8, which Straczynski was a writer.

The series received mixed reviews from critics.

E-Ratic (2020–2021) 
E-Ratic is a limited series written and drawn by Kaare Andrews, and colored by Brian Reber. The series began on December 2, 2020, and ended on April 27, 2021. The series tells the story about a teenage high schooler who has just been bestowed with great powers, but he has to fight against interdimensional monsters.

The Resistance: Reborns (2021) 
The Resistance: Reborns is a one-shot issue written by J. Michael Straczynski, drawn by C. P. Smith and colored by Snakebite Cortez. The book was published on January 6, 2021. The issue features an anthology of five stories that happen during the Great Death. Straczynski said he used his previous experience from Babylon 5 to expand The Resistance with other stories and characters through this anthology. Axel Alonso explained that The Resistance, which was created a year prior to the COVID-19 pandemic, somehow predicted the current issues in the world, considering it "the X-Men of the 21st century".

The Resistance: Uprising (2021) 
The Resistance: Uprising is the sequel of The Resistance, written by J. Michael Straczynski, drawn by C. P. Smith and colored by Snakebite Cortez. The series began on April 7, 2021, and ended on September 29, 2021. Straczynski explained that while The Resistance was written prior to the COVID-19 pandemic, Uprising was written before the political events of December 2020–January 2021. Smith described the book as “an allegory of our times.” Alonso added that Uprising "is about maintaining hope during hopeless times. It’s about people who look past their differences, recognize their common humanity, and refuse to surrender their values in an increasingly corrupt time.”

The series received mixed reviews from critics.

Moths (2021) 
Moths is a limited series written by Straczynski, and drawn and colored by artist Mike Choi. The series began on June 2, 2021, and ended on November 24, 2021. Straczynski and Alonso said the series follows a young woman who, although she survives the pandemic, her lifespan is instead reduced by the abilities she receives. Choi said he "wanted to paint a book that was very much grounded in realism so that while the idea of 'superpowers' felt extraordinary, the characters' reactions to them were very ordinary. The characters in Moths are people who should reflect us and our experiences so that we can relate to them as much as possible, so how they're depicted and described are geared specifically towards that goal."

Knighted (2021–2022) 
Knighted is a limited series written by Gregg Hurwitz, drawn by Mark Texeira and colored by Brian Reber. The series began on November 8, 2021, and ended on April 20, 2022. Hurwitz said he was inspired by Stan Lee and Steve Ditko's run on Spider-Man, as well as Mark Millar and John Romita Jr's run on Kick-Ass, and the two years Hurwitz spent writing Batman. This led him to the idea about what if the original superhero was a very bad person, while the protagonist was pure of heart but much too meek for his own good. Alonso said, “with Knighted, Gregg and Mark are deconstructing and, in fact, reinventing an all-too familiar super-hero paradigm in the context of a brand-new shared universe that’s rooted in the 21st Century.”

The Joneses (2022) 
The Joneses is a limited series written by Mike Moreci, drawn by Alessandro Vitti and colored by Ive Svorcina. The series began on April 6, 2022 and concluded on August 31, 2022. Moreci announced the series is focused on an interracial family with powers, with elements inspired in the Fantastic Four and The Incredibles.

E-Ratic 2: Recharged (2022–2023) 
E-Ratic 2: Recharged is the sequel of E-Ratic, written and drawn by Kaare Andrews, and colored by Brian Reber. The series began on September 7, 2022 and will conclude on February 8, 2023. The story follows the main character teaming up with a barbarian princess who claims to be from another dimension.

Collected editions

References 

2020 comics debuts
Comics by J. Michael Straczynski
Fictional universes